Arnica is an unincorporated community in Cedar County, in the U.S. state of Missouri.

History
A post office called Arnica was established in 1883, and remained in operation until 1907. The community took its name from a nearby spring where arnica grew.

In 1925, Arnica had 110 inhabitants.

References

Unincorporated communities in Cedar County, Missouri
Unincorporated communities in Missouri